Pristavica may refer to a number of settlements in Slovenia:

Pristavica, Rogaška Slatina
Pristavica, Šentjernej
Pristavica pri Velikem Gabru